Aleksandr Ivanovich Sloboda (27 August 1920 – 14 November 2022) was a Belarusian politician. A member of the Communist Party of the Soviet Union, he served on the Supreme Council of Belarus from 1991 to 1994.

Sloboda died on 14 November 2022, at the age of 102.

References

1920 births
2022 deaths
Belarusian centenarians
Men centenarians
Soviet partisans
Communist Party of the Soviet Union members
Members of the Supreme Soviet of the Byelorussian SSR (1962–1966)
Members of the Supreme Council of Belarus
Heroes of Socialist Labour
Recipients of the Order of Lenin
Recipients of the Order of the Red Banner
Recipients of the Order of the Red Banner of Labour
Recipients of the Medal "For Courage" (Russia)
Recipients of the Medal of Zhukov
People from Verkhnyadzvinsk District